Isaac Padilla Cañadas (born 23 March 1996) is a Spanish professional footballer who currently plays for Iraqi Premier League club Al-Diwaniya as a midfielder.

Career

After playing for the youth academies of Damm and Espanyol, Padilla joined the youth academy of Spanish La Liga side Barcelona, where an injury prevented him from reaching the first team.

For the second half of 2016/17, he signed for UE Sant Julià in Andorra, making 10 league appearances and scoring 9 goals.

In 2019, Padilla signed for Spanish fourth division team Castelldefels.

For the second half of 2020, he signed for Al-Diwaniya in Iraq.

References

External links
 Isaac Padilla at LaPreferente

Spanish footballers
Living people
1996 births
Association football forwards
Footballers from L'Hospitalet de Llobregat
CF Badalona players
UE Sant Julià players
Al-Diwaniya FC players
CF Damm players
RCD Espanyol footballers
CE Sabadell FC footballers
FC Barcelona players
CF Reus Deportiu players
Spanish expatriate footballers
Expatriate footballers in Iraq
Expatriate footballers in Andorra
Spanish expatriate sportspeople in Andorra
Spanish expatriate sportspeople in Iraq